St. George's Cathedral or Cathedral of St. George may refer to:

Australia 
St George's Cathedral, Perth (Anglican)

Austria 
St. George's Cathedral, Wiener Neustadt

Canada 
 St. George's Cathedral (Kingston, Ontario), Anglican
 Cathedral of St. George (Saskatoon), Ukrainian Catholic

Ethiopia 
 St. George's Cathedral, Addis Ababa, built in 1896

Georgia (country) 
 Cathedral of Saint George, Tbilisi (Armenian Apostolic)

Germany 
 Limburg Cathedral (Catholic), also known as Georgsdom or Limburger Dom in German after its dedication to Saint George

Guyana 
 St. George's Cathedral, Georgetown, one of the world's tallest freestanding wooden structures

India 

 St. George's Cathedral, Chennai (formerly Madras)

Israel and Palestine 
 St. George's Cathedral, Jerusalem

Italy 
 St George's Cathedral, Ferrara
 St George's Cathedral, Caccamo

Kosovo 
Cathedral of Saint George, Prizren

Lebanon 
Maronite Cathedral of Saint George, Beirut
Saint George Greek Orthodox Cathedral, Beirut

Romania 
St. George Cathedral, Timișoara

Russia
Saint George Cathedral, Yuryev-Polsky

Serbia 
St. George's Cathedral, Novi Sad

Sierra Leone 
 St. George's Cathedral, Freetown

South Africa 
 St. George's Cathedral, Cape Town

Syria 
 Cathedral of Saint George, Damascus

Turkey 
St. George's Cathedral, Istanbul (Greek Orthodox)

Ukraine 
 St. George's Cathedral, Lviv

United Kingdom 
 St George's Cathedral, Southwark, London (Catholic)
 St George's Cathedral, London, in Camden Town (Antiochian Orthodox)

United States 
 Cathedral of St. George Historic District, in Boston, Massachusetts, listed on the U.S. National Register of Historic Places
 St. George Cathedral (Canton, Ohio) (Romanian Greek Catholic)

See also
 Saint George (disambiguation)
 Cathedral of St Michael and St George (disambiguation)